Liberty Township is a township in Beltrami County, Minnesota, United States. The population was 623 as of the 2000 census.

Geography
According to the United States Census Bureau, the township has a total area of 36.3 square miles (94.1 km2), of which 33.0 square miles (85.3 km2) is land and 3.4 square miles (8.8 km2) (9.36%) is water.

Major highway
  Minnesota State Highway 89

Lakes
 Campbell Lake  (vast majority)
 Deer Lake
 Ess Lake (vast majority)
 Lake Erick
 Long Lake
 Mud Lake
 Muskrat Lake (south quarter)
 Peterson Lake
 Pony Lake
 Ragged Lake
 Round Lake
 Wolf Lake

Adjacent townships
 Maple Ridge Township (north)
 Durand Township (northeast)
 Turtle Lake Township (east)
 Northern Township (southeast)
 Eckles Township (south)
 Lammers Township (southwest)
 Buzzle Township (west)

Cemeteries
The township contains Trinity Cemetery.

Demographics
As of the census of 2000, there were 623 people, 232 households, and 181 families residing in the township.  The population density was 18.9 people per square mile (7.3/km2).  There were 279 housing units at an average density of 8.5/sq mi (3.3/km2).  The racial makeup of the township was 96.31% White, 2.09% Native American, 0.48% Asian, 0.16% Pacific Islander, and 0.96% from two or more races. Hispanic or Latino of any race were 0.48% of the population.

There were 232 households, out of which 40.1% had children under the age of 18 living with them, 63.8% were married couples living together, 8.2% had a female householder with no husband present, and 21.6% were non-families. 17.2% of all households were made up of individuals, and 6.0% had someone living alone who was 65 years of age or older.  The average household size was 2.69 and the average family size was 3.04.

In the township the population was spread out, with 28.7% under the age of 18, 9.3% from 18 to 24, 32.6% from 25 to 44, 20.2% from 45 to 64, and 9.1% who were 65 years of age or older.  The median age was 35 years. For every 100 females, there were 107.0 males.  For every 100 females age 18 and over, there were 104.6 males.

The median income for a household in the township was $45,391, and the median income for a family was $44,722. Males had a median income of $31,250 versus $22,750 for females. The per capita income for the township was $18,482.  About 3.2% of families and 4.4% of the population were below the poverty line, including 5.1% of those under age 18 and 3.9% of those age 65 or over.

References
 United States National Atlas
 United States Census Bureau 2007 TIGER/Line Shapefiles
 United States Board on Geographic Names (GNIS)

Townships in Beltrami County, Minnesota
Townships in Minnesota